The Midwich Cuckoos is a British science fiction television series on Sky Max, created by David Farr. It is based on the 1957 book of the same name by John Wyndham. It stars Keeley Hawes and Max Beesley. It began airing on 2 June 2022, and all episodes became available on Sky On Demand.  In Australia, the entire series is available on Stan.

Synopsis 
The Midwich Cuckoos is a sci-fi drama in which all of the titular town's child-bearing aged women inexplicably fall pregnant. As these women give birth, Midwich begins to realise these children are unlike any other. Each child resembles their mother (unlike the book where they all have golden eyes, dark blonde hair, and pale, silvery skin). They have their mother's DNA, but with alien additions.  And some male, implying a Y chromosome. The government takes an immediate interest and imposes secrecy, paying the parents for their cooperation.

Cast

Main
 Keeley Hawes as Dr. Susannah Zellaby
 Max Beesley as DCI Paul Haynes
 Aisling Loftus as Zoë Moran
 Ukweli Roach as Sam Clyde
 Lara Rossi as Jodie Blake
 Synnøve Karlsen as Cassie Stone
 Samuel West as Bernard Westcott

Supporting and recurring

Episodes

Reception 
The series received mixed reviews. Lucy Mangan of The Guardian gave the first episode two out of five stars, feeling it did not make the most of its adaptational changes and topicality with its emphasis on the perspective of female characters. Nick Hilton of The Independent also gave it two out of five stars, deeming it 'humourless' and criticizing the production. By contrast, Mark Kermode on Kermode and Mayo's Take praised the series' tone, use of horror and performances, saying it was a successful update of the novel. Carol Midgley of The Times also gave it four stars, praising the atmospheric direction and Farr's scripts. On review aggregator Rotten Tomatoes, the series holds an approval rating of 71% based on 14 reviews.

References

External links 
 

2022 British television series debuts
2022 British television series endings
2020s British horror television series
2020s British science fiction television series
2020s British mystery television series
Sky UK original programming
Horror drama television series
English-language television shows
Television shows based on British novels